Peggs is an unincorporated community and census-designated place (CDP) in Cherokee County, Oklahoma, United States. It had a population of 813 at the 2010 census, compared to 814 at the 2000 census.  A large minority of its residents are Native American, most of them members of 10 tribal groups such as the Cherokee Nation and the Muscogee Creek Nation.

History
The post office was established December 6, 1899. It was named for Thomas Pegg, acting principal chief of the Cherokee Nation during the Civil War.

A tornado destroyed Peggs on May 2, 1920, killing 71 people, what was about 30 percent of the town's population at the time. It is the deadliest tornado on record to have struck within NWS Tulsa's county warning area, and the third-deadliest in Oklahoma history (after Woodward in 1947 and Snyder pre-statehood in 1905).  In May 2019 another tornado hit Peggs, but the EF-2 caused no fatalities, only damage to a few homes and businesses.

Geography
Peggs is located in northwestern Cherokee County, along Oklahoma State Highway 82, which leads southeast  to Tahlequah, the county seat, and northwest  to Locust Grove in Mayes County.

Demographics

Economy
There are three convenience stores and one post office in the small community. There is also a senior community center serving noon meals to senior citizens.

Education
Peggs currently has one elementary (Pre-K-8) school, with 9-12 grade either going to neighboring Tahlequah, Hulbert, or Locust Grove to high school.

References

Unincorporated communities in Cherokee County, Oklahoma
Unincorporated communities in Oklahoma
Cherokee towns in Oklahoma